Artur Anatolyevich Maksimchuk (born 12 January 2002) is a Russian football player. He plays for FC Spartak Moscow.

Club career
He made his debut in the Russian Football National League for FC Spartak-2 Moscow on 6 March 2022 in a game against FC Olimp-Dolgoprudny.

References

External links
 
 
 
 Profile by Russian Football National League

2002 births
Sportspeople from Luhansk Oblast
Ukrainian emigrants to Russia
Living people
Russian footballers
Russia youth international footballers
Association football forwards
FC Rubin Kazan players
FC Saturn Ramenskoye players
FC Spartak-2 Moscow players
FC Akron Tolyatti players
Russian Second League players
Russian First League players